Sergeant Shivpal Singh (born 6 July 1995) is an Indian javelin thrower and a Senior Non Commissioned Officer (SNCO) in Indian Air Force.

He finished eighth at the 2018 Asian Games and won the silver medal at the 2019 Asian Championships.

Shivpal Singh failed to qualify for the men's javelin throw final at IAAF World Championships 2019.

His personal best throw is 86.23 metres, achieved at the 2019 Asian Championships in Doha.

In 2016, Shivpal Singh won the men’s javelin throw event at the Budapest Open athletics in Hungary. He finished eighth in the previous edition of the Asian games (2018) as he could only manage one throw off his 3 chances due to an elbow injury. In 2015, he was selected for the junior world championships but was left out of the squad because of the injury. The journey from national championships to the big stage has been quite eventful for the young man from Varanasi, Uttar Pradesh.

Shivpal threw the javelin at a distance of 85.47 metres to qualify for 2020 Olympics.

He was suspended for four years for doping violations, with the suspension running up to 10th October 2025.

Personal life 
Shivpal Singh is a resident of Hingutargarh village under Dhanapur block of Chandauli district in Uttar Pradesh. His father Ramashray Singh is working in PAC. Shivpal has inherited the sport of javelin throw. His father, uncle Shivpujan Singh and Jagmohan Singh are also javelin throwers.

References

1997 births
Living people
Indian male javelin throwers
Athletes (track and field) at the 2018 Asian Games
Asian Games competitors for India
Athletes (track and field) at the 2020 Summer Olympics
Olympic athletes of India